The Staatskapelle Berlin is a German orchestra and the resident orchestra of the Berlin State Opera, Unter den Linden. The orchestra is one of the oldest in the world. Until the fall of the German Empire in 1918 the orchestra's name was Königliche Kapelle, i.e. Royal Orchestra.

History
The orchestra traces its roots to 1570, when Joachim II Hector, Elector of Brandenburg established the rules for an orchestra at his court which had been constituted, at an unknown date. The orchestra became affiliated with the Royal Court Opera, established in 1742 by Frederick the Great. Noted musicians associated with the orchestra have included Carl Philipp Emanuel Bach, Franz Benda, and Johann Joachim Quantz.

The first concert by the ensemble for a wider audience outside of the royal courts was on 1 March 1783 at the Hotel Paris, led by Johann Friedrich Reichardt, the ensemble's Kapellmeister. After the advent of Giacomo Meyerbeer as Kapellmeister, from 1842, the role of the orchestra expanded and a first annual concert series for subscribers was launched. The orchestra gave a number of world and German premieres of works by Richard Wagner, Felix Mendelssohn, and Otto Nicolai.

The orchestra's music director, the Staatskapellmeister, holds the same post with the Berlin State Opera. The orchestra was in the eastern part of Berlin, and thus was part of East Germany from 1945 to 1990.

The former Staatskapellmeister of the orchestra and the opera has been Daniel Barenboim since 1992. Barenboim has had the title of "conductor for life" for the ensemble since 2000 (he would later resign on 6 January 2023 as its GMD, for health reasons).  In July 2013, the orchestra made its first-ever appearances at The Proms, performing the four operas of Der Ring des Nibelungen, the first complete Ring cycle to be given in a single Proms season.  In January 2017, the orchestra and Barenboim performed the complete symphonies of Anton Bruckner at Carnegie Hall, the first live Bruckner symphony cycle ever performed in the United States.  In July 2017, the orchestra was the first non-UK orchestra to perform the two completed symphonies of Edward Elgar at The Proms in a single season.

Barenboim and the orchestra have made recordings for the Teldec, Deutsche Grammophon, and Decca labels.

Leadership

 1759–1775 Johann Friedrich Agricola
 1775–1794 Johann Friedrich Reichardt (Hofkapellmeister)
 1816–1820 Bernhard Anselm Weber
 1820–1841 Gaspare Spontini
 1842–1846 Giacomo Meyerbeer
 1848–1849 Otto Nicolai
 1871–1887 Robert Radecke (Hofkapellmeister)
 1888–1899 
 1899–1913 Richard Strauss
 1913–1920 Leo Blech (Hofkapellmeister)
 1923–1934 Erich Kleiber
 1935–1936 Clemens Krauss
 1941–1945 Herbert von Karajan
 1948–1951 Joseph Keilberth
 1954–1955 Erich Kleiber
 1955–1962 Franz Konwitschny
 1964–1990 Otmar Suitner
 1992–2023 Daniel Barenboim

Honorary conductors
 Otmar Suitner
 Pierre Boulez
 Zubin Mehta

References

External links

German orchestras
Music in Berlin
Berlin State Opera

Musical groups established in the 16th century
Organizations established in the 1570s
1570 establishments in the Holy Roman Empire